The 2017 Milan–San Remo was a road cycling one-day race that took place on 18 March. It was the 108th edition of the Milan–San Remo, and the eighth event of the 2017 UCI World Tour.

After they broke clear on the race's final climb – the Poggio di San Remo – 's Michał Kwiatkowski won the race in a three-up sprint finish ahead of world champion Peter Sagan and  rider Julian Alaphilippe.

Teams
As Milan–San Remo was a UCI World Tour event, all eighteen UCI WorldTeams were invited automatically and obliged to enter a team in the race. Seven UCI Professional Continental teams competed, completing the 25-team peloton.

Route
As one of the sports monuments, Milan–San Remo – generally considered to be a sprinters' classic – is among the highest-rated races in professional cycling. The final part of the race included the climbs of the Cipressa and the Poggio di San Remo, which usually prove decisive for the race outcome. Also on the route, the riders also had to tackle the  climb of the Passo dello Turchino, although it was not considered to be a key point in the race. After the Turchino, the route followed the Aurelia road along the coast from Genoa all the way to the finish in Sanremo. With a little over  left to go, the first of the coastal climbs started with the Capo Mele, the Capo Cervo and the Capo Berta, before meeting the final two climbs leading to the finish.

Result

References

Sources

External links

2017 UCI World Tour
2017 in Italian sport
2017
2017 in road cycling
March 2017 sports events in Italy